Radenska is a Slovenia-based worldwide known brand of mineral water, trademark of Radenska d.o.o. company. It is one of the oldest Slovenian brands.

Brand history

Development of the mineral water company started at Radenci in 1869, when Karl Henn, owner of the land, filled the first bottles of mineral water. By the end of the century, the company had sold over 1 million bottles.

Three hearts
Mineral water brand name Radenska Three Hearts (Radenska Tri srca) has been in use since 1936. It was designed in 1931 by the illustrator Milko Bambič. According to the author, the three hearts symbolised three former nations of the Kingdom of Yugoslavia: Serbs, Croats, and Slovenes.

Sponsorship
The company is the title sponsor of UCI Continental cycling team .

References

External links 
 Radenska  homepage

Bottled water brands
Slovenian brands
1869 introductions
1869 establishments in Austria-Hungary
Slovenian drinks